Qasem Kheyl may refer to:
 Qasem Khel, Afghanistan
 Qasem Kheyl-e Arateh, Iran